James Rohleder (born 7 April 1955) is a German judoka. He competed in the men's half-lightweight event at the 1984 Summer Olympics.

References

External links
 

1955 births
Living people
German male judoka
Olympic judoka of West Germany
Judoka at the 1984 Summer Olympics
Sportspeople from Bremerhaven
20th-century German people